Dickinson's kestrel (Falco dickinsoni) is a bird of prey of southern and eastern Africa belonging to the falcon family Falconidae. It is named after John Dickinson, an English physician and missionary who collected the type specimen. It is also known as the white-rumped kestrel. Its closest relatives are the grey kestrel and banded kestrel and the three are sometimes placed in the subgenus Dissodectes.

Description

It is a fairly small, stocky kestrel with a large, square head. The female is about 4% larger and 10-20% heavier than the male. The plumage is mostly dark grey with a pale head and rump. The tail is grey with narrow black bars and a broad subterminal band. The underside of the flight feathers are also barred. The cere and feet are yellow and there is bare yellow skin around the eye. The bill is dark grey and the eyes are brown. Juvenile birds are grey-brown with barred flanks and without the paler head and rump. They have a greenish cere and eye-ring.

It is usually silent but has a high-pitched alarm and contact call. At the nest, a soft, mewing call attracts the young for feeding.

Distribution and habitat
It inhabits savanna and open woodland, particularly swampy areas near water. It favours miombo woodland and is typically associated with palm trees (such as Hyphaene and Borassus species) and is also often found near baobab trees. It occurs in coconut plantations in some areas.

Its range covers most of Mozambique, Zimbabwe, Zambia and Malawi along with north-eastern South Africa (mainly in Kruger National Park), northern Botswana, north-east Namibia, eastern Angola, southern Democratic Republic of the Congo and parts of Tanzania. It is an occasional visitor to Kenya. It is generally rather scarce but is commoner in some areas such as Zanzibar and Pemba Islands. Loss of palm trees is a potential threat to the species.

Behaviour
It usually hunts from a perch and only occasionally hovers. Large insects such as grasshoppers form the bulk of the diet. It also feeds on lizards and amphibians and sometimes birds, bats, rodents and snakes. It is often attracted to grass fires where it preys on fleeing insects and other prey.

The breeding season lasts from July to October in Tanzania and September to December further south. The nest is a simple scrape with no material used. Sometimes the old nest of a Hamerkop is used. One to four eggs are laid. They are cream-coloured with reddish-brown markings and are incubated by the female for at least 30 days. The young birds fledge after approximately 33 to 35 days.

References

Beolens, Bo & Watkins, Michael (2003) Whose Bird?: Men and women commemorated in the common names of birds, Christopher Helm, London.
Channing, Keith (2007) The Hawk Conservancy Trust: Dickinson's Kestrel - Falco dickinsoni. Accessed 01/07/07.
Ferguson-Lees, James & Christie, David A. (2001) Raptors of the World, Christopher Helm, London.
Global Raptor Information Network (2007) Species account: Dickinson's Kestrel Falco dickinsoni. Downloaded from http://www.globalraptors.org on 1 Aug. 2007.
Sinclair, Ian & Ryan, Peter (2003) Birds of Africa south of the Sahara, Struik, Cape Town.
Zimmerman, Dale A.; Turner, Donald A. & Pearson, David J. (1999) Birds of Kenya & Northern Tanzania, Christopher Helm, London.

External links

 Dickinson's kestrel - Species text in The Atlas of Southern African Birds.
Dickinson's kestrel (Falco dickinsoni) pictures

Dickinson's kestrel
Birds of Southern Africa
Dickinson's kestrel
Dickinson's kestrel